"Full Moon and Empty Arms" is a 1945 popular song by Buddy Kaye and Ted Mossman, based on Sergei Rachmaninoff's Piano Concerto No. 2.

The best-known recording of the song was made by Frank Sinatra in 1945 and reached No. 17 in the Billboard charts. A version by Ray Noble & His Orchestra (vocal by Snooky Lanson) also charted, reaching the No. 18 position briefly.

Other recordings include:
Bob Eberly with Carmen Cavallero, piano (1946)
 Erroll Garner Trio (Instrumental, 1946)
 Eddie Fisher (1955)
 Donna Brooks (1956)
 Nelson Eddy (1960)
 Robert Goulet (1961)
 Sarah Vaughan (1963)
 Jerry Vale (1964)
 Mina (1966)
 Freddie Hubbard (1976)
 Bob Dylan (2015)
 Maureen Moore (1964)
It has also been recorded by Caterina Valente 1960, The Platters 1963, Carmen Cavallaro 1946, Jim Nabors, June Valli, and Billy Vaughn 1958.

References

1945 songs
Frank Sinatra songs
Songs with lyrics by Buddy Kaye
Songs with music by Ted Mossman
Bob Dylan songs
Caterina Valente songs
Torch songs
Popular songs based on classical music